Satya Vyas (born 1 January 1980, Bokaro, Jharkhand) is an Indian writer of modern Hindi. He is a graduate in Law from Banaras Hindu University. He is born and brought up in Bokaro Steel City and has authored 5 bestselling Hindi Novels.

Writing career

Vyas' first book  Banaras Talkies, was published in 2015, and an English language translation by Himadri Agarwal was published in 2022

His other books are Dilli Darbar, Chaurasi / 84, Baghi Ballia, and Uff Kolkata.

Satya Vyas writes in a wider genre and with different backgrounds.

Satya Vyas has a huge fan following among the youth.

His books have been translated in many languages.

Banaras Talkies has been translated in Assamese, Manipuri, and English.

Dilli Durbar  has been translated in English by Westland publishers.

Chaurasi has also been translated in Urdu and Punjabi and has been adapted to a tele series on OTT called Grahan. Grahan's original network is Hotstar.

Notable work

 Banaras Talkies – 2015
 Dilli Darbar – 2016
 Chaurasi – 2018
 Baaghi Ballia – 2019
 Uff Kolkata – 2020
Shishir ki Girlfriend (Audio story)
Grahan (Webseries)
Kala Paisa (Audio Series)
Qaatil Kaun (Audio Series)

References

External links
Official Website

1980 births
Living people
People from Bokaro Steel City
Indian writers